Morrill Hall may refer to (all are buildings named for Justin Smith Morrill):

Morrill Hall (Cornell University), the building at Cornell University
Morrill Hall (University of Illinois at Urbana–Champaign), a campus building located at the University of Illinois at Urbana–Champaign
Morrill Hall (Iowa State University)
Morrill Hall (University of Maryland)
Morrill Hall (University of Minnesota), an administration building located on the Twin Cities campus of the University of Minnesota
Morrill Hall (University of Nevada, Reno)
Morrill Hall (North Dakota State University), a campus building located at North Dakota State University
Morrill Hall (Oklahoma State University)
Morrill Hall (University of Tennessee), a residence hall located at the University of Tennessee, Knoxville campus
Morrill Hall (University of Vermont)
Morrill Hall (Washington State University)
University of Nebraska State Museum